RCIC may refer to:

 Royal Canadian Infantry Corps
 Regulated Canadian Immigration Consultant, see Immigration Consultants of Canada Regulatory Council (ICCRC) 
 Rite of Christian Initiation of Children, a process to initiate children into the Catholic faith
 Reactor core isolation cooling system, a security system inside boiling water nuclear reactors